Julius Bliek (born 9 June 1994) is a Dutch professional footballer who plays as a central defender for Sliema Wanderers.

Career
Bliek played in the youth team of JVOZ, and then played for the Zeeland amateur clubs DFS, SV Duiveland, FC Dauwendaele and VV Kloetinge. In 2017 he left for FC Dordrecht, where he signed an amateur contract for a year. He made his debut in professional football on 29 September 2017, in a home match against FC Volendam, which finished 2–2. He was replaced in the 75th minute by Mailson Lima. In the summer of 2018, he signed a two-year contract with Go Ahead Eagles.

In January 2020 he moved to Georgian club Saburtalo Tbilisi.

On 23 June 2020, Bliek returned to FC Dordrecht after making no appearances for Saburtalo. He signed a one-year contract. He left at the end of his contract in June 2021.

In August 2021, Bliek signed for Maltese side Sliema Wanderers on a one-year contract.

Career statistics

References

1994 births
Living people
Dutch footballers
VV Kloetinge players
FC Dordrecht players
Go Ahead Eagles players
Eerste Divisie players
Association football defenders
Sportspeople from Vlissingen
FC Saburtalo Tbilisi players
Sliema Wanderers F.C. players
Dutch expatriate footballers
Dutch expatriate sportspeople in Georgia (country)
Expatriate footballers in Georgia (country)
Footballers from Zeeland
Dutch expatriate sportspeople in Malta
Expatriate footballers in Malta